True Blue is a 2001 American crime thriller film written and directed by J.S. Cardone and starring Tom Berenger, Lori Heuring, and Pamela Gidley.

Plot summary
New York Police Officer Rembrandt "Remy" Macy (Berenger) investigates a murder which began by the discovery of a disembodied hand. After the victim is identified, the victim's ex-flatmate Nikki (Heuring) becomes scared that she may be in danger and stays at Macy's place until they can get to the bottom of the situation. After accidentally seeing her near-naked, he finds himself starting to become attracted to her and she is able to seduce him. As he investigates clue after clue, he finds out that a large conspiracy is in play involving some of the most powerful leaders in New York City, Chinese Triads and possibly Nikki herself.

Principal cast
 Tom Berenger as Rembrandt 'Remy' Macy 
 Lori Heuring as Nikki 
 Pamela Gidley as Beck 
 Barry Newman as 'Monty' 
 Leo Lee as Benny Lee 
 Soon-Tek Oh as 'Tiger'
 Joshua Peace as Oren Doba
 Alec McClure as Bouton 
 Pedro Miguel Arce as 'Bounce'

Critical reception
David Nussair of Reel Film Reviews gave the film 1/2 stars out of four:

Mitch Lovell of The Video Vacuum:

References

External links 

2001 films
2001 crime thriller films
American crime thriller films
American independent films
Films set in New York City
Films shot in Toronto
Films directed by J. S. Cardone
2000s English-language films
2000s American films